Fórmula V is a Spanish pop musical quintet founded in 1965 in Spain.  The musical style is very much in the style of 60's rock similar to the Beatles and Monkees. In the late 1960s the band experienced enormous popularity in Spain and Latin America.

The group members are:
Francisco de Asís Pastor (vocals)(b. 1949 in Madrid, Spain)
Antonio Sevilla (Drums)
Mariano Sanz (Bass Guitar) (b. 1948)
Joaquin de la Pena (Lead Guitar)
Amador Flores (Keyboards)

They are famous for the songs:
Eva María
Cuéntame
Nueve Sobre Diez
Ayer Y Hoy
Vacaciones de Verano
La Fiesta de Blas
Carolina

Francisco (also known as Paco Pastor), still tours with Formula V in the new millennium.

External links
 Official website 

Spanish musical groups